Sir Percival Hart (14 January 1569 – 8 March 1642) of Lullingstone Castle, Kent was an English politician.

Career
Hart was the eldest surviving son of Sir George Hart of Lullingstone. He married Anne Manwood (sister of Roger Manwood), Jane Stanhope (daughter of Sir Edward Stanhope (died 1603)), then Mary Morrison. He was educated at New College, Oxford (1584) and Gray's Inn (1602).

Hart was Member of Parliament for Kent in 1598 following the death of William Brooke in a duel and for Lewes in 1601. He was knighted in 1601. In May 1603 he sent fish and poultry from the Lullingstone estate to King James at Theobalds.

Marriages and family
Hart married, firstly Anne, daughter of Sir Roger Manwood, and secondly, Jane, daughter of Edward Stanhope.

He had at least 2 sons and a daughter and was succeeded by William, his eldest son by his first wife. His second son was Sir Henry Hart, whose son Sir Percival Hart afterwards inherited Lullingstone Castle on William's childless death.

References

1569 births
1642 deaths
People from Lullingstone
Alumni of New College, Oxford
Members of Gray's Inn
Knights Bachelor
17th-century English people
English MPs 1597–1598
English MPs 1601